In physics, a dimensionless physical constant is a physical constant that is dimensionless, i.e. a pure number having no units attached and having a numerical value that is independent of whatever system of units may be used.
In aerodynamics for example, if one considers one particular airfoil, the Reynolds number value of the laminar–turbulent transition is one relevant dimensionless physical constant of the problem. However, it is strictly related to the particular problem: for example, it is related to the airfoil being considered and also to the type of fluid in which it moves.

On the other hand, the term fundamental physical constant is used to refer to some universal dimensionless constants.
The correct use of the term fundamental physical constant should be restricted to the dimensionless universal physical constants that currently cannot be derived from any other source. This precise definition is the one that will be followed here.

However, the term fundamental physical constant has been sometimes used to refer to certain universal dimensioned physical constants, such as the speed of light c, vacuum permittivity ε0, Planck constant h, and the gravitational constant G, that appear in the most basic theories of physics. NIST and CODATA sometimes used the term in this in the past.

Characteristics
There is no exhaustive list of such constants but it does make sense to ask about the minimal number of fundamental constants necessary to determine a given physical theory. Thus, the Standard Model requires 25 physical constants, about half of them are the masses of fundamental particles (which become "dimensionless" when expressed relative to the Planck mass or, alternatively, as coupling strength with the Higgs field along with the gravitational constant).

Fundamental physical constants cannot be derived and have to be measured. Developments in physics may lead to either a reduction or an extension of their number: discovery of new particles, or new relationships between physical phenomena, would introduce new constants, while the development of a more fundamental theory might allow the derivation of several constants from a  more fundamental constant.

A long-sought goal of theoretical physics is to find first principles (theory of everything) from which all of the fundamental dimensionless constants can be calculated and compared to the measured values.

The large number of fundamental constants required in the Standard Model has been regarded as unsatisfactory since the theory's formulation in the 1970s. The desire for a theory that would allow the calculation of particle masses is a core motivation for the search for "Physics beyond the Standard Model".

History
In the 1920s and 1930s, Arthur Eddington embarked upon extensive mathematical investigation into the relations between the fundamental quantities in basic physical theories, later used as part of his effort to construct an overarching theory unifying quantum mechanics and cosmological physics. For example, he speculated on the potential consequences of the ratio of the electron radius to its mass. Most notably, in a 1929 paper he set out an argument based on the Pauli exclusion principle and the Dirac equation that fixed the value of the reciprocal of the fine-structure constant as 𝛼−1 = 16 +  × 16 × (16 − 1) = 136. When its value was discovered to be closer to 137, he changed his argument to match that value. His ideas were not widely accepted, and subsequent experiments have shown that they were wrong (for example, none of the measurements of the fine-structure constant suggest an integer value; in 2018 it was measured at α = 1/137.035999046(27)).

Though his derivations and equations were unfounded, Eddington was the first physicist to recognize the significance of universal dimensionless constants, now considered among the most critical components of major physical theories such as the Standard Model and ΛCDM cosmology. He was also the first to argue for the importance of the cosmological constant Λ itself, considering it vital for explaining the expansion of the universe, at a time when most physicists (including its discoverer, Albert Einstein) considered it an outright mistake or mathematical artifact and assumed a value of zero: this at least proved prescient, and a significant positive Λ features prominently in ΛCDM.

Eddington may have been the first to attempt in vain to derive the basic dimensionless constants from fundamental theories and equations, but he was certainly not the last. Many others would subsequently undertake similar endeavors, and efforts occasionally continue even today. None have yet produced convincing results or gained wide acceptance among theoretical physicists.

An empirical relation between the masses of the electron, muon and tau has been discovered by physicist Yoshio Koide, but this formula remains unexplained.

Examples
Dimensionless fundamental physical constants include:
 α, the fine-structure constant, the coupling constant for the electromagnetic interaction (≈ ). Also the square of the electron charge, expressed in Planck units, which defines the scale of charge of elementary particles with charge.
 μ or β, the proton-to-electron mass ratio, the rest mass of the proton divided by that of the electron (≈1836). More generally, the ratio of the rest masses of any pair of elementary particles.
 αs, the coupling constant for the strong force (≈ 1)

Fine-structure constant
One of the dimensionless fundamental constants is the fine-structure constant:

where e is the elementary charge, ħ is the reduced Planck constant, c is the speed of light in vacuum, and ε0 is the permittivity of free space. The fine-structure constant is fixed to the strength of the electromagnetic force. At low energies, α ≈ , whereas at the scale of the Z boson, about 90GeV, one measures α ≈ . There is no accepted theory explaining the value of α; Richard Feynman elaborates:

Standard model
The original standard model of particle physics from the 1970s contained 19 fundamental dimensionless constants describing the masses of the particles and the strengths of the electroweak and strong forces. In the 1990s,  neutrinos were discovered to have nonzero mass, and a quantity called the vacuum angle was found to be indistinguishable from zero.

The complete standard model requires 25 fundamental dimensionless constants (Baez, 2011). At present, their numerical values are not understood in terms of any widely accepted theory and are determined only from measurement. These 25 constants are:
 the fine structure constant;
 the strong coupling constant;
 fifteen masses of the fundamental particles (relative to the Planck mass mP = ), namely:
 six quarks
 six leptons
 the Higgs boson
 the W boson
 the Z boson
 four parameters of the CKM matrix, describing how quarks oscillate between different forms;
 four parameters of the Pontecorvo–Maki–Nakagawa–Sakata matrix, which does the same thing for neutrinos.
 Note: whenever we are talking about angle we are talking about radians which are equal to 1.

Cosmological constants
The cosmological constant, which can be thought of as the density of dark energy in the universe, is a fundamental constant in physical cosmology that has a dimensionless value of approximately 10−122. Other dimensionless constants are the measure of homogeneity in the universe, denoted by Q, which is explained below by Martin Rees, the baryon mass per photon, the cold dark matter mass per photon and the neutrino mass per photon.

Barrow and Tipler
Barrow and Tipler (1986) anchor their broad-ranging discussion of astrophysics, cosmology, quantum physics, teleology, and the anthropic principle in the fine-structure constant, the proton-to-electron mass ratio (which they, along with Barrow (2002), call β), and the coupling constants for the strong force and gravitation.

Martin Rees's Six Numbers
Martin Rees, in his book Just Six Numbers, mulls over the following six dimensionless constants, whose values he deems fundamental to present-day physical theory and the known structure of the universe:
 N ≈ 1036: the ratio of the electrostatic and the gravitational forces between two protons.  This ratio is denoted α/αG in Barrow and Tipler (1986). N governs the relative importance of gravity and electrostatic attraction/repulsion in explaining the properties of baryonic matter;
 ε ≈ 0.007: The fraction of the mass of four protons that is released as energy when fused into a helium nucleus. ε governs the energy output of stars, and is determined by the coupling constant for the strong force;
 Ω ≈ 0.3: the ratio of the actual density of the universe to the critical (minimum) density required for the universe to eventually collapse under its gravity. Ω determines the ultimate fate of the universe. If Ω ≥ 1, the universe may experience a Big Crunch. If Ω < 1, the universe may expand forever;
 λ ≈ 0.7: The ratio of the energy density of the universe, due to the cosmological constant, to the critical density of the universe.
 Q ≈ 10−5: The energy required to break up and disperse an instance of the largest known structures in the universe, namely a galactic cluster or supercluster, expressed as a fraction of the energy equivalent to the rest mass m of that structure, namely mc2;
 D = 3: the number of macroscopic spatial dimensions.

N and ε govern the fundamental interactions of physics. The other constants (D excepted) govern the size, age, and expansion of the universe. These five constants must be estimated empirically. D, on the other hand, is necessarily a nonzero natural number and does not have an uncertainty. Hence most physicists would not deem it a dimensionless physical constant of the sort discussed in this entry.

Any plausible fundamental physical theory must be consistent with these six constants, and must either derive their values from the mathematics of the theory, or accept their values as empirical.

Use in SI

In 2019, fundamental physical constants have been introduced for the definition of all SI units and derived units.

See also
 Cabibbo–Kobayashi–Maskawa matrix (Cabibbo angle)
 Dimensionless numbers in fluid mechanics
 Dirac large numbers hypothesis
 Neutrino oscillation
 Physical cosmology
 Standard Model
 Weinberg angle
 Fine-tuned universe
 Koide formula

References

Bibliography
 Martin Rees, 1999. Just Six Numbers: The Deep Forces that Shape the Universe. London: Weidenfeld & Nicolson. 
 Josef Kuneš, 2012. Dimensionless Physical Quantities in Science and Engineering. Amsterdam: Elsevier.

External articles
General
 John D. Barrow, 2002. The Constants of Nature; From Alpha to Omega The Numbers that Encode the Deepest Secrets of the Universe. Pantheon Books. .
 
 Michio Kaku, 1994. Hyperspace: A Scientific Odyssey Through Parallel Universes, Time Warps, and the Tenth Dimension. Oxford University Press.
 Fundamental Physical Constants from NIST
 Values of fundamental constants. CODATA, 2002.
 John Baez, 2002, "How Many Fundamental Constants Are There?"
 Simon Plouffe, 2004, "A search for a mathematical expression for mass ratios using a large database."

Articles on variance of the fundamental constants
 
 John D. Barrow and Webb, J. K., "Inconstant Constants – Do the inner workings of nature change with time?" Scientific American (June 2005).
 Michael Duff, 2002 "Comment on time-variation of fundamental constants."